Hugo Esequiel Silva (born 4 February 1992) is an Argentine professional footballer who plays as a right-back for Defensa y Justicia.

Career
Silva's first club were Argentine Primera División side Racing Club. He appeared on the substitutes bench for the first-team in March 2011 but went unused in a 4–1 defeat to Lanús. Later that year, on 30 November, he made his professional debut in a Copa Argentina win against El Porvenir. He featured again in the next round vs. Patronato, which Racing Club also won as they went onto finish as runners-up. In July 2014, Silva joined Atlanta of Primera B Metropolitana. He made his career league debut on 13 September during a 1–0 defeat to Tristán Suárez. One goal in forty-five games followed across 2014 and 2015.

In January 2016, Silva signed for Argentine Primera División team Defensa y Justicia. His first appearance in the top-flight arrived on 4 March in an away win against Argentinos Juniors. He went onto make twenty-eight appearances in three seasons with the club. In January 2018, Silva agreed to join Mitre in Primera B Nacional on loan. Silva had another loan spell out in July 2019, signing for Estudiantes. Across both spells, the defender appeared thirty-four times and scored twice. In August 2020, Silva joined Godoy Cruz In July 2021, Silva joined Defensa y Justicia
.

Career statistics
.

References

External links

1992 births
Living people
People from Quilmes
Argentine footballers
Association football defenders
Argentine Primera División players
Primera B Metropolitana players
Primera Nacional players
Racing Club de Avellaneda footballers
Club Atlético Atlanta footballers
Defensa y Justicia footballers
Club Atlético Mitre footballers
Estudiantes de Buenos Aires footballers
Godoy Cruz Antonio Tomba footballers
Sportspeople from Buenos Aires Province